The Bottom 14 Championship was a rugby league knockout competition held by the Rugby Football League in the 1964–65 season. The competition was used by RFL secretary Bill Fallowfield to trial an experimental rule change where the play-the-ball was replaced with an alternative method of releasing the ball similar to rugby union. The tournament lasted only one season, and was won by Huddersfield.

Background
In February 1965, the Rugby Football League (RFL) announced that a competition would be staged at the end of the 1964–65 season for the bottom 14 clubs, and would be used to trial an alternative method of playing the ball. The experiment was one of several attempts by the RFL to find a solution to discourage negative tactics being used by teams to keep possession of the ball.

Although some clubs declined to take part, the competition went ahead as planned. The final was contested by Doncaster and Huddersfield at Tattersfield, with Huddersfield winning 13–3 in front of a crowd of 2,450.

The competition was not held again after the 1964–65 season, and the rule change was ultimately rejected at the RFL's annual general meeting.

References

1965 in English rugby league
Rugby league competitions in the United Kingdom